The legislative districts of Masbate are the representations of the province of Masbate in the various national legislatures of the Philippines. The province is currently represented in the lower house of the Congress of the Philippines through its first, second, and third congressional districts.

History 

Masbate initially comprised a single district in 1898, when it elected two representatives to the Malolos Congress that lasted until 1899. The island of Burias, currently part of Masbate, also had a separate representation during such legislature.

Masbate later became part of the second district of Sorsogon from 1907 to 1922. Separating from Sorsogon to be reestablished as an independent province in 1920, the province regained its representation effective in 1922. It was part of the representation of Region V from 1978 to 1984, and from 1984 to 1986 it elected two assemblymen at-large. In 1987, it was redistricted into three legislative districts under the new Constitution which was proclaimed on February 11, 1987, and elected members to the restored House of Representatives starting that same year.

Current Districts

Lone District (defunct)

At-Large (defunct)

1943–1944

1984–1986

See also 
Legislative districts of Sorsogon

References 

Masbate
Politics of Masbate